The 2019–20 Bangladesh Women's Football League, also known as the Tricotex Bangladesh Women's Football League 2019–20 due to sponsorship reason, it was the 3rd season of domestic women's club football competition in Bangladesh hosted and organized by Bangladesh Football Federation (BFF). In this edition, 7 teams were participated.

The league has begun from 22 February 2020. On 16 March Bangladesh suspended all competition due to the coronavirus pandemic. However, BFF said that the league season will resume in early November.

Effects of the 2020 coronavirus pandemic
On 16 March 2020, All sorts of sports activities in Bangladesh were postponed until 31 March as a precaution to combat the spread of coronavirus in the country, according to a press release issued by the Ministry of Youth and Sports.

Bangladesh Football Federation (BFF) postponed all Bangladesh Premier League and Women's Football League matches until 31 March.

In August 2020, BFF's women's football committee chairman Mahfuza Akter Kiron stated that the postponed season of Bangladesh Women's Football League will resume in the first week of November. They also asked the clubs to start preparation through letters.

Venue
All matches were held at the BSSS Mostafa Kamal Stadium in Dhaka, Bangladesh.

Teams

Clubs and locations
Seven teams participated in the league. Former champions Abahani Limited Dhaka not participating in this edition. Every team will play for first time in the league. Begum Anowara SC first time participate of women football league.  Bashundhara Kings is the only team from men's premier league to participate. Sheikh Jamal Dhanmondi Club & Sheikh Russel KC were about to participate but withdrew their name just before the transfer window ends while Cumilla United & MK Gallactico Sylhet confirmed their participation lately.

Personnel and sponsoring

League table

Goalscorers

35 goals
 Sabina Khatun (Bashundhara Kings)
22 goals
 Krishna Rani Sarkar (Bashundhara Kings)
16 goals
 Tohura Khatun (Bashundhara Kings)
14 goals
 Swapna Rani (Nasrin Sporting Club)
11 goals
 Mosamat Sultana (FC Uttar Bongo)
10 goals
 Sheuli Azim (Bashundhara Kings)
7 goals
 Sadia (Jamalpur Kacharipara Akadas)
 Tonima Bishwas (FC Uttar Bongo)
 Aklima Khatun (Nasrin Sporting Club)
 Jannath Islam Rumi (Jamalpur Kacharipara Akadas)
6 goals
 Rituparna (Nasrin Sporting Club)
5 goals
 Shohagi Akter (Nasrin Sporting Club)
 Mosammat Nargis Sultana (Bashundhara Kings)
 Maria Manda (Bashundhara Kings)
 Monika Chakma (Bashundhara Kings)
4 goals
 Noushin Jahan (Nasrin Sporting Club)
 Mishrat Jahan Moushumi (Bashundhara Kings)
 Anika Akter (Jamalpur Kacharipara Akadas)
3 goals
 Razia Khatun (Nasrin Sporting Club)
 Roksana (MK Gallactico Sylhet FC)
 Sanjida Akhter (Bashundhara Kings)
 Unnoti Khatun (Nasrin Sporting Club)
 Munni (Bashundhara Kings)
 Mst Rekha Aktar (FC Uttar Bongo)
 Ashamoni (Cumilla United)
 Kursia Jannath (Jamalpur Kacharipara Akadas)
 Akhi Khatun (Bashundhara Kings)
 Aasha (Jamalpur Kacharipara Akadas)
 Selina Khatun (Anoara Sporting Club)
 Anuching Mogini (Nasrin Sports Academy)
2 goals
 Nowshan (Nasrin Sporting Club)
 Sajeda Khatun  (Nasrin Sporting Club)
 Elamoni (Anwara Sporting Club)
 Swapna Islam (Anwara Sporting Club)
 Bipasha (MK Gallactico Sylhet FC)
 Mosammat Taneya (Jamalpur Kacharipara Akadas)
 Sadia (Anwara Sporting Club)
 Rita (FC Uttar Bongo)
 Borna (MK Gallactico Sylhet FC)
 Mosammat Sirat Jahan Shopna (Bashundhara Kings)
 Thuienu (Cumilla United)
 Marzia (Nasrin Sporting Club)
1 goal
 Malonee Chakma (FC Uttar Bongo)
 Rehena (Nasrin Sporting Club)
 Masuda (Cumilla United)
 Chowa Khatun (Jamalpur Kacharipara Akadas)
 Rupa Akter (Bashundhara Kings)
 Subarna (Jamalpur Kacharipara Akadas)
 Shirina (Jamalpur Kacharipara Akadas)
 Ainka Tanjum (Jamalpur Kacharipara Akadas)
 Nahar (Cumilla United)
 Anai (Nasrin Sports Academy)
 Shibalika (Anoara Sporting Club)
 Moni (MK Gallactico Sylhet FC)
 Kiting (Cumilla United)
 Iti (Anoara Sporting Club)
 Masura (Bashundhara Kings)
 Shamsunnahar (Bashundhara Kings)
 Nusrat Jahan (FC Uttar Bongo)
 Salma Akter (MK Gallactico Sylhet FC)
 Sapna Akter (Anoara Sporting Club)
 Kolpona Akter (Anoara Sporting Club)
 TBD (FC Uttar Bongo)
 TBD (FC Uttar Bongo)
1 own goal
 Mukta Das (playing against Bashundhara Kings)
 Unnoti (playing against Bashundhara Kings)

References

2020 in Bangladeshi football
Bangladesh Women's Football League seasons
Women's football in Bangladesh
Association football events postponed due to the COVID-19 pandemic
2019–20 in Asian association football leagues
2019–20 domestic women's association football leagues